Drammens Elektriske Bane (lit: Drammens Electric Rail) was a Norwegian company that operated the Drammen trolleybus between December 15, 1909 and April 30, 1916. The company was started by M. Magnus, Otto Aubert and Olaf Berger in 1908 and built the initial 7.7 km of trolleybus line in Drammen with a capital of NOK 140,000. The company had good economy until World War I when the company ran into great economic problems. They initially tried to solve the problem by increasing the ticket price from 10 øre to 15 øre and a 25% discount on electricity from the municipality, but could not meet their obligations. The remains of the company were taken over by A/S Trikken.

References 
Defunct bus companies of Norway
Trolleybus transport in Norway
Companies based in Drammen
Transport companies established in 1908
Transport companies disestablished in 1916
1908 establishments in Norway
1916 disestablishments in Norway